Denis Genreau (born 21 May 1999) is a professional footballer who plays as an attacking midfielder for  club Toulouse. Born in France, he plays for the Australia national team.

Background
Genreau was born in Paris, France, to French parents Sophie and Marc Genreau. Following Denis' birth, they moved with their family to Australia, having fond memories of a honeymoon there. Denis attended Scotch College before becoming a professional footballer.

Club career

Melbourne City
Genreau made his debut against Perth Glory in the 80th minute mark at age 17.

Loan to PEC Zwolle
On 26 June 2018, Genreau was loaned to PEC Zwolle for the 2018–19 season, where he re-united with former Melbourne City coach John van 't Schip.

Macarthur FC
Genreau signed for Macarthur FC as a part of their inaugural season from Melbourne City.

Toulouse
On 31 July 2021, Macarthur FC announced that a transfer fee was agreed with Ligue 2 club Toulouse.

International career
Given Genreau's birth, and parental links, to France, he was eligible to represent both France and Australia at international level.

Genreau made his international debut with the Australia national team on 7 June 2021 in a World Cup Qualifier against Chinese Taipei.

Career statistics

Club

International

Honours
Toulouse
 Ligue 2: 2021–22

Individual
 Macarthur Medal: 2020–21
 Harry Kewell Medal: 2021–22

References

External links
 
 
 

1999 births
Living people
Footballers from Paris
Association football midfielders
Australian soccer players
Australia youth international soccer players
Australia under-20 international soccer players
Australia international soccer players
French footballers
Australian people of French descent
French emigrants to Australia
Melbourne City FC players
PEC Zwolle players
Macarthur FC players
Toulouse FC players
A-League Men players
Eredivisie players
Ligue 2 players
Ligue 1 players
Footballers at the 2020 Summer Olympics
Olympic soccer players of Australia